WUFK was an FM radio station at the University of Maine at Fort Kent that began in July 1974. It was owned by the University of Maine System and licensed to the community of Fort Kent, Maine. Originally on 90.3 MHz, it later moved to 92.1 MHz around 1982 and continued there until its license was canceled on November 7, 2005.

References

External links
Callsign data for DWUFK
FCC History Cards for WUFK

UFK
Defunct radio stations in the United States
Radio stations established in 1974
Radio stations disestablished in 2005
UFK (defunct)
University of Maine at Fort Kent
Fort Kent, Maine
1974 establishments in Maine
2005 disestablishments in Maine
UFK